Jaroslav Jiřík (December 10, 1939 – July 11, 2011) was a Czech professional ice hockey right winger. He became the first player that an Eastern Bloc country released to play in the National Hockey League when he appeared in three games with the St. Louis Blues in the 1969–70 season.

Playing career
Jiřík played seventeen seasons in the Czechoslovak Extraliga, scoring 300 goals in 450 games. Jiřík was named an all-star at the 1965 World Championship in Finland, and he was a member of the Czechoslovak national team that won the bronze medal at the 1964 Winter Olympics and the silver medal at the 1968 Winter Olympics. He scored 83 goals in 134 international games for Czechoslovakia.

Jiřík was first noticed by St. Louis Blues assistant general manager Cliff Fletcher in 1969.  Fletcher actually signed three Czechoslovak players: Jiřík, Jan Havel, and Josef Horešovský, all of whom were given permission to transfer to North America by the Czechoslovak government. However, the government changed its mind about Havel and Horesovský, because they were still in their twenties. Jiřík, 30 at the time, was the only player allowed to go.

Jiřík spent most of the 1969–70 season with St. Louis's minor-league affiliate, the Kansas City Blues of the Central Hockey League.  He played well in Kansas City, scoring 35 points in 53 games. St. Louis called him up late in the season, and he played three games with the club, going scoreless. He was invited to remain with the organization for the 1970–71 season; however, Jiřík decided to return to Czechoslovakia instead.

Post-playing career
After his playing career, Jiřík coached several Czechoslovak clubs and ran the Swiss national team from 1977 to 1980.

On July 11, 2011, Jiřík, an experienced pilot, died in a plane crash near Brno.

Career statistics

Regular season and playoffs

International

 Note: Statistics are incomplete. Jiřík scored 300 goals in 450 Czechoslovak league games, and 83 goals in 134 international games.

References

External links
 

1939 births
2011 deaths
Czech ice hockey forwards
Czechoslovak expatriate sportspeople in the United States
Czechoslovak ice hockey forwards
Ice hockey players at the 1960 Winter Olympics
Ice hockey players at the 1964 Winter Olympics
Ice hockey players at the 1968 Winter Olympics
Rytíři Kladno players
HC Kometa Brno players
Kansas City Blues players
Medalists at the 1964 Winter Olympics
Medalists at the 1968 Winter Olympics
Olympic bronze medalists for Czechoslovakia
Olympic ice hockey players of Czechoslovakia
Olympic medalists in ice hockey
Olympic silver medalists for Czechoslovakia
People from Žďár nad Sázavou District
St. Louis Blues players
Victims of aviation accidents or incidents in the Czech Republic
Sportspeople from the Vysočina Region
Czechoslovak expatriate ice hockey people